David Elliot Shaw (born March 29, 1951) is an American billionaire scientist and former hedge fund manager. He founded D. E. Shaw & Co., a hedge fund company which was once described by Fortune magazine as "the most intriguing and mysterious force on Wall Street". A former assistant professor in the computer science department at Columbia University, Shaw made his fortune exploiting inefficiencies in financial markets with the help of state-of-the-art high speed computer networks. In 1996, Fortune magazine referred to him as "King Quant" because of his firm's pioneering role in high-speed quantitative trading. In 2001, Shaw turned to full-time scientific research in computational biochemistry, more specifically molecular dynamics simulations of proteins.

Early life and education
Shaw was raised in Los Angeles, California. His father was a theoretical physicist who specialised in plasma and fluid flows, and his mother is an artist and educator. They divorced when he was 12. His stepfather, Irving Pfeffer, was professor of finance at University of California, Los Angeles, and the author of papers supporting the efficient market hypothesis.

Shaw earned a bachelor's degree summa cum laude from the University of California, San Diego, a PhD from Stanford University in 1980, and then became an assistant professor of the department of computer science at Columbia University. While at Columbia, Shaw conducted research in massively parallel computing with the NON-VON supercomputer. This supercomputer was composed of processing elements in a tree structure meant to be used for fast relational database searches. Earlier in his career, he founded Stanford Systems Corporation.

Investment career
In 1986, he joined Morgan Stanley, as Vice President for Technology in Nunzio Tartaglia's automated proprietary trading group. In 1994, Shaw was appointed by President Clinton to the President's Council of Advisors on Science and Technology, where he was chairman of the Panel on Educational Technology. In 2000, he was elected to the board of directors of the American Association for the Advancement of Science served as its treasurer 2000–2010. In 2007, Shaw was elected as a fellow of the American Academy of Arts and Sciences. In 2009, he was appointed by President Obama again to the President's Council of Advisors on Science and Technology. In 2012, he was elected to the National Academy of Engineering and in 2014 was elected to the National Academy of Sciences.

D. E. Shaw
In 1988 he started his own hedge fund, D. E. Shaw & Co, which employed proprietary algorithms for securities trading. In 2018, Forbes estimated his net worth at $6.2 billion. He is also a senior research fellow at the Center for Computational Biology and Bioinformatics at Columbia University, and an adjunct professor of biomedical informatics at Columbia's medical school. Shaw is chief scientist of D. E. Shaw Research, which conducts interdisciplinary research in the field of computational biochemistry.

According to the Institutional Investor's Alpha magazine's annual ranking for 2014, D. E. Shaw, who made $530 million in 2014, and  James H. Simons of Renaissance Technologies who made $1.2 billion were among the top 25 earners in the hedge fund industry. They are both "quantitative strategists who founded firms that build algorithms for trading."

Political and philanthropic donations
Shaw has donated US$2.25 million to Priorities USA Action, a super PAC supporting Democratic presidential candidate Hillary Clinton and $1 million to Organizing for Action.

Through the Shaw Family Endowment Fund, by 2014 he and his wife have donated $400,000 to the Stephen Wise Free Synagogue, $400,000 to Memorial Sloan Kettering Cancer Center, and $800,000 to the Horace Mann School. From 2011 to 2017, the Fund annually donated $1 million to Yale University, Stanford University, Harvard University, Princeton University, and $500,000 to Columbia University and Brown University. The college donations represent over 60% of the Fund's philanthropy. Shaw was on the board of the American Association for the Advancement of Science.

Personal life
Shaw is married to personal finance commentator and journalist Beth Kobliner. Shaw is Jewish and he and his wife are members of the Stephen Wise Free Synagogue in New York. They have three children, and live in New York City. In 2014, Shaw purchased several homes in Westchester County, New York and combined them into a mansion that received press attention.

See also
List of computer scientists
Computational chemistry

References

External links
D. E. Shaw Research
D. E. Shaw & Co. official website
Bio and photo at D. E. Shaw Research website
New Architectures for a New Biology - a 2006 lecture by David E. Shaw for the Stanford University Computer Systems Colloquium 
The Deal Weekly News
David E. Shaw at Columbia Systems Biology

1951 births
20th-century American Jews
American biochemists
American billionaires
American chief executives
American computer scientists
American hedge fund managers
American investors
American money managers
American philanthropists
American stock traders
Columbia School of Engineering and Applied Science alumni
Columbia University faculty
Stanford University alumni
University of California, San Diego alumni
Members of the United States National Academy of Engineering
Members of the United States National Academy of Sciences
Thinking Machines Corporation
Mathematical finance
Computational chemists
Living people
21st-century American Jews